Vexillum poppei is a species of small sea snail, marine gastropod mollusk in the family Costellariidae, the ribbed miters.

Description
The shell size varies between 20 mm and  30 mm

Distribution
This species is distributed in the seas along the Philippines.

References

External links
 

poppei
Gastropods described in 2007